Mayan Revival is a modern architectural style popular in the Americas during the 1920s and 1930s that drew inspiration from the architecture and iconography of pre-Columbian Mesoamerican cultures.

History

Origins 

Though the name of the style refers specifically to the Maya civilization of southern Mexico and Central America, in practice, this revivalist style frequently blends Maya architectural and artistic motifs "playful pilferings of the architectural and decorative elements" with those of other Mesoamerican cultures, particularly the Central Mexican Aztec architecture styling from the pre-contact period as exhibited by the Mexica and other Nahua groups. Although there were mutual influences between these original and otherwise distinct and richly varied pre-Columbian artistic traditions, the syncretism of these modern reproductions is often an ahistorical one.

Historian Marjorie Ingle traces the history of this style to the Pan American Union Building by Paul Philippe Cret which incorporates numerous motifs drawn from the indigenous traditions of the Americas. Maya and Mexica elements in the Pan American Union Building include the floor mosaics surrounding a central fountain (most of the motifs are copied directly from sculpture at Copan) and figures on lights flanking the entrance to the building. The building's Art Museum of the Americas contains numerous stoneware architectural details that are copied from Maya and Mexica art.

In the Art Deco period 

Several prominent architects worked in this style, including Frank Lloyd Wright. Wright's Hollyhock House on Olive Hill in Los Angeles copied the shape of temples from Palenque, and the Imperial Hotel in Tokyo was in the shape of a Mesoamerican pyramid. His Ennis House, Millard House (La Miniatura), Storer House, and Freeman House in Los Angeles are built in his concrete textile block system, with bas reliefs and modular unit construction evoking the geometric patterning on the façades of Uxmal buildings.

Wright's son, landscape architect and architect Lloyd Wright, served as construction manager for three of his father's four textile block houses.  He independently designed the iconic Mayan-modernist John Sowden House in 1926 in the Los Feliz District of Hollywood.

Wright's disciple Arata Endo constructed the Kōshien Hotel in the 1930s, heavily influenced by the architecture of the Imperial Hotel in Tokyo.

Commissioned in 1953, the massive pyramid of the Beth Sholom Synagogue with its geometric roof detailing is perhaps the most direct Wright evocation of Maya form.

Prominent examples 
Likely the most publicized example of Mayan Revival was Robert Stacy-Judd's Aztec Hotel of 1924–1925.  Its façade, interiors and furniture incorporated abstract patterns inspired by the Maya script with Art Deco influences, and it was built on the original U.S. Route 66 in Monrovia, California.

Stacy-Judd was directly influenced by John Lloyd Stephens writings, and perhaps even more so by the illustrations by Frederick Catherwood as presented in their book Incidents of Travel in Central America, Chiapas and Yucatan, a work that introduced many to the wondrous ruins of Central America.  In it Stacy-Judd explains the choice of the name of the hotel: "When the hotel project was first announced, the word Maya was unknown to the layman. The subject of Maya culture was only of archaeological importance, a, at that, concerned but a few exponents. As a word Aztec was fairly well known, I baptized the hotel with that name, although all the decorative motifs are Maya." Although the buildings use of reinforced concrete to create the intricate designs on the exterior one opinionated observer wrote: "The bizarre Aztec forms may create the atmosphere desired, and will serve the legitimate publicity interests of the establishment, but it would be deplorable if an 'Aztec Movement' set in and the style copyists were diverted from noble examples to the forms of a semi-barbaric people."

Other prominent buildings in this style include:

 the Aurora Elks Lodge in Aurora, Illinois, 1926
 the Mayan Theater in Los Angeles by Stiles O. Clements, 1927
 the Petroleum Building, Houston, by the Anglo-American architect Alfred Bossom, a notable proponent of Mayan Revival, 1927
 The Casino Club building in San Antonio, Texas, 1927.
 and the Fisher Theater by Albert Kahn in Detroit, where the great scholar of the Maya, Sylvanus G. Morley was involved in the design, 1928
 the Guardian Building by Wirt C. Rowland of Smith Hinchman & Grylls, 1928–1929
 450 Sutter Street in San Francisco by Timothy L. Pflueger, 1929
 United Office Building in Niagara Falls, New York by James A. Johnson of Esenwein & Johnson, 1929
 the Mayan Theater in Denver by Montana Fallis, 1929–1930
 The Lincoln Theater in Marion, Virginia. 1929
 The Berkeley Public Library, 1934
 The Hall of Waters in Excelsior Springs, Missouri, 1937. National Register of Historic Places.
 Art and History Museums—Maitland Art Center, Maitland, FL, 1938.  Winter artist colony designed by J. Andre Smith. National Historic Landmark

See also 
 Art Deco of the 20s and 30s
 Art Deco Architecture: Design, Decoration and Detail from the Twenties and Thirties
 Cultural appropriation
 Mesoamerican architecture
 Maya art
 México City México Temple

References

Bibliography 
Barrett, John.  "The Pan American Union: Peace, Friendship, Commerce."  Washington, D.C.: Pan American Union.  1911
Braun, Barbara.  Pre-Columbian Art and the Post-Columbian World: Ancient American Sources of Modern Art. New York.  Harry N. Abrams. 1993.
 Gebhard, David and Peres, Anthony. Robert Stacy-Judd: Maya Architecture and the Creation of a New Style. Capra Press. 1993.
 Ingle, Marjorie I. The Mayan Revival Style: Art Deco Mayan Fantasy. University of New Mexico Press. 1989.
 ---. Atlantis: Mother of Empires. Los Angeles. De Vorse & Co. 1939
 ---. The Ancient Mayas, Adventures In the Jungles of Yucatan. Los Angeles. Haskell-Travers, Inc. 1934
 ---. A Maya Manuscript. Los Angeles. Philosophical Research Society. 1940.

 Phillips, Ruth Anne. " 'Pre-Columbian Revival': Defining and Exploring a U.S. Architectural Style, 1910-1940." Ph.D. diss. (New York: City University of New York, 2007).
 Willard, T. A., The City of the Sacred Well, Being a Narrative of the Discoveries and Excavations of Edward Herbert Thompson in the Ancient City of Chi-chen Itza With Some Discourse on the Culture and Development of the Mayan Civilization as Revealed by Their Art and Architecture, Here Set Down and Illustrated From Photographs. New York. Century Co. 1926

External links 

Route 66-org: the Aztec Hotel – Monrovia

 
Revival architectural styles
Architectural styles
American architectural styles
House styles
Revival architecture in the United States